Twimight was an open source Android client for the social networking site Twitter. The client let users view in real time "tweets" or micro-blog posts on the Twitter website as well as publish their own.

Added value
In addition to being a fully functional, ad-free and open-source  Twitter client, Twimight allowed communication if the cellular network is unavailable (for example, in case of a natural disaster). Twimight was also equipped with a feature called the "disaster mode", which users could enable or disable at will. When the disaster mode was enabled and the cellular network was down, Twimight used peer-to-peer communication to let users tweet in any circumstance. Enabling the disaster mode enabled on the phone's Bluetooth transceiver and connected the user to other nearby phones. This created a mobile ad hoc network or MANET, which could be used, for example, to locate missing persons even when the communication infrastructure had failed.

History
Twimight started out as a project for a Master thesis at ETH Zurich in the spring of 2011.

References

External links
The Twimight development website

Free mobile software
Mobile social software
Free and open-source Android software
Android (operating system) software
Twitter services and applications
2013 software
Wireless networking
Microblogging software
Geosocial networking